Dave Pinto (born April 12, 1972) is an American politician serving in the Minnesota House of Representatives since 2015. A member of the Minnesota Democratic–Farmer–Labor Party (DFL), Pinto represents District 64B, which includes parts of Saint Paul in Ramsey County, Minnesota.

Early life, education and career
Pinto grew up in Falcon Heights, Minnesota. He attended Harvard University, graduating with a bachelor's degree, and the University of Virginia, graduating with a M.B.A. and J.D. 

Pinto worked as a clerk for Judge Diana E. Murphy in the 8th Circuit Court of Appeals, and in the office of U.S. Representative Bruce Vento. Pinto is an assistant attorney for Ramsey County.

Minnesota House of Representatives
Pinto was first elected to the Minnesota House of Representatives in 2014, after the retirement of DFL incumbent Michael Paymar, and has been reelected every two years since.

Pinto served as an assistant minority leader from 2017-18. From 2019-2021, Pinto served as chair of the Early Childhood Finance and Policy Committee. Since 2023, Pinto has chaired the Children and Families Finance and Policy Committee, and sits on the Public Safety Finance and Policy, Taxes, and Ways and Means Committees.

Electoral history

Personal life
Pinto is married to his wife, Abby. They have two children and reside in St. Paul.

References

External links

 Rep. Dave Pinto official Minnesota House of Representatives website
 Dave Pinto official campaign website

1972 births
Living people
Democratic Party members of the Minnesota House of Representatives
Harvard University alumni
21st-century American politicians
People from Falcon Heights, Minnesota
University of Virginia School of Law alumni
University of Virginia Darden School of Business alumni